Claude Morin may refer to:

Claude Morin (PQ politician), Parti Québécois Member of the Quebec legislature and Cabinet Member, 1976–1982
Claude Morin (Beauce politician), ADQ Member of the Quebec legislature, 2007–